The Finnish Railway Museum is located in Hyvinkää, Finland. It was founded in 1898 and located in Helsinki. The museum was moved to Hyvinkää in 1974.

The museum is on the original station and yard site of the Hanko–Hyvinkää railway. In addition to the station building, there is a roundhouse and several other preserved buildings, mainly from the 1870s. The museum also has a live steam backyard railroad track, where train rides are offered to the public during special run days in the summer months.

Exhibits

See also
 Jokioinen Museum Railway
 Hanko–Hyvinkää railway

External links

Finnish Railway Museum Official website
Steam Locomotives in Finland Including the Finnish Railway Museum
 Photographs of Finnish Steam Locomotives
 Youtube video of the Museum miniature railway in use
 Finnish website with locomotive technical data
 Nykarleby Jernväg Museum Railway
 Veturimuseo at Toijala

History of Helsinki
Hyvinkää
Museums established in 1898
Museums in Uusimaa
Railway museums in Finland
1898 establishments in Finland